Rindala Kodeih (born 3 February) is a Lebanese director, actress and producer, who has worked in  many series. She also directed Video clips of several singers from Europe and Arab countries.

Personal life and Career 
Kodeih was born in Africa to Lebanese father and mother. She studied in France. Later on, she received an award from the Beirut International Film Festival for direction Al Arisha movie.

See also 
 Nadine Labaki
 Joana Hadjithomas
 Danielle Arbid
 Leila Kanaan
 Mirna Khayat

References

External links 
 Rindala Kodeih in IMDb

1979 births
Living people
Lebanese women film directors
Members of Syndicate of Professional Artists in Lebanon
Lebanese television actresses
Lebanese music video directors